Rodolfo Migliari (born May 21, 1976) is an Argentine comic book cover artist and painter. He is best known for creating the painted portrait of the Justice Society of America that appears in the Smallville episode Absolute Justice. And for illustrating the covers of Rogue, Green Lantern Corps and Blackest Night.

Bibliography
Migliari's comics cover art (except where indicates) includes:

DC
Blackest Night, miniseries, #4-7, hardcover edition (2009–10)
Blackest Night: Tales of the Corps, miniseries, #2 (2009)
DCU Holiday Special 2008 (interior art)Final Crisis: Resist (2008)Final Crisis: Submit (2008)Green Arrow, vol. 4, #9-11 (2011)Green Lantern Corps, vol. 2, #22, 27-28, 34-37, 47-48 (2008-10)Green Lantern, vol. 4, #43 (2009)Green Lantern: Emerald Warriors, miniseries, #1-7 (2010-11)Superman #682 (2009)

CompilationsBlackest Night: Green Lantern Corps, Hardcover editionBlackest Night: Green Lantern, Hardcover editionBlackest Night HardcoverBlackest Night: Black Lantern Corps HCBlackest Night: Black Lantern Corps #2 HCImageCity of Heroes #1-14 (2005-06)Common Grounds #1-6 (2004)CovenantFour Eyes #1 (2008)Freshmen #1-6Freshmen YearbookFreshmen II #1-6Hunter Killer DossierNoble Causes #2 (2004)Wanted  #1 (2003)Witchblade #92, 104 (interior art, among other artists) (2005-07)

MarvelCaptain America Annual 2001Elektra #26 (2003)Last Defenders, miniseries, #5 (2008)Rogue #1-6 (2004-05)X-Men: X-Treme X-Pose, miniseries, #1-2 (2003)Villains for Hire, miniseries, #1-4 (2011-12)

Wizard EntertainmentWizard #175 (interior art)Wizard #186 (cover)Wizard Mega movie Issue spring 2005 (interior art)Wizard Mega movie Issue summer 2006 (interior art)How to Draw Advanced Techniques (cover with Terry Dodson)

Other publishersBuddy Scalera’s Men and Boys photo reference (Impact)KISS 4K #1-6 (Platinum Studios)Star Wars: Infinities - Return of the Jedi, miniseries, #1-4 (Dark Horse, 2003)Vampirella'' #3 (Dynamite Entertainment)

Interviews
NCI: Noticias TV Interview
rtve.es Radio Interview

References

External links
 Official Blog
 Official Facebook Page

1976 births
Living people
Argentine comics artists